The Daily Progress is the sole daily newspaper in the vicinity of Charlottesville, Virginia, United States. It has been published daily, since September 14, 1892. The paper was founded by James Hubert Lindsay and his brother Frank Lindsay. The Progress was initially published six days a week; the first Sunday edition was printed in September 1968. Lindsay's family owned the paper for 78 years. On November 30, 1970, the family announced a sale to the Worrell Newspaper group, which took over on January 1, 1971.

T. Eugene Worrell, of Bristol, Virginia, owned about two dozen rural weekly newspapers and a few dailies, all with less circulation than the Daily Progress. The Progress immediately became the group's flagship paper, and Worrell moved his newspaper group headquarters to Charlottesville.

Faced with major newspaper industry changes in 1995, Worrell sold his newspaper properties to Richmond-based Media General, which was later purchased by Nexstar Media Group, as a part of a larger $230M deal. 

In the 21st century, Media General sold the Progress''' printing press, and reorganized its operations to print multiple newspapers from other printing plants it controlled.

On May 17, 2012, Media General, Inc. announced signed agreements with Berkshire Hathaway, Inc., whereby a subsidiary of Berkshire Hathaway, BH Media Group, will purchase newspapers owned by Media General, including the Progress.

Following the Unite the Right rally in Charlottesville in August 2017, Paul Chadwick of The Guardian wrote that the staff of the Progress'' "demonstrate in a practical, relatable way the importance of journalism to community, civil society and functioning democracy."

Ryan M. Kelly, who worked for the newspaper at the time, took a photograph of the August 12, 2017 vehicular attack that resulted in the death of Heather Heyer won the 2018 Pulitzer Prize for breaking news photography.

References

External links
 
 
 History of Media General
 Daily Progress and Newsplex lay off staff

1892 establishments in Virginia
Daily newspapers published in Virginia
Lee Enterprises publications
Mass media in Charlottesville, Virginia
Publications established in 1892